= Patronymic (disambiguation) =

A patronymic or patronym is a component of a personal name based on the given name of a male ancestor.

Patronymic may also refer to:

- Patronymic suffix, a suffix to indicate the patronymic derivation
- Patronymic surname, a surname originated from the name of the father
- Patronym (taxonomy), a scientific name honoring a person or persons
